The following lists events that happened during 1999 in Sri Lanka.

Incumbents
President: Chandrika Kumaratunga
Prime Minister: Sirimavo Bandaranaike
Chief Justice: G. P. S. de Silva then Sarath N. Silva

Governors
 Central Province – Stanley Tillekeratne 
 North Central Province – G. M. S. Samaraweera 
 North Eastern Province – Asoka Jayawardena  
 North Western Province – Hector Arawwawala (until 3 January); Siripala Jayaweera (starting 3 January)
 Sabaragamuwa Province – C. N. Saliya Mathew 
 Southern Province – Neville Kanakeratne (until 20 September); Ananda Dassanayake (starting 20 September)
 Uva Province – Ananda Dassanayake (until 1999); Sirisena Amarasiri (starting 1999)
 Western Province – K. Vignarajah

Chief Ministers
 Central Province – 
 until April: Vacant
 April-June: Sarath Ekanayake
 starting June: Nandimithra Ekanayake 
 North Central Province – vacant (until June); Berty Premalal Dissanayake (starting June)
 North Western Province – Nimal Bandara (until 28 January); S. B. Nawinne (starting 28 January)
 Sabaragamuwa Province – 
 until April: Vacant
 April-June: Kantha Gunatilleke
 starting June: Athauda Seneviratne 
 Southern Province – Mahinda Yapa Abeywardena 
 Uva Province – 
 until April: Vacant
 April: Nalini Weerawanni
 starting April: Samaraweera Weerawanni
 Western Province – vacant (until June); Susil Premajayanth (starting June)

Events
 On 16 November 1999, the fourth official presidential elections of Sri Lanka take place. Chandrika Kumaratunga, wins by a 51.12% margin amidst several assassination attempts prior to the campaign. 
 In October 1999 the Oddusuddan offensive took place, it was a military operation in which the Tamil Tigers captured Oddusuddan from the Sri Lankan Army. The Tamil Tigers are believed to have captured large amounts of weapons & ammunitions as well as armoured vehicles in this operation.

Notes 

a.  Gunaratna, Rohan. (1998). Pg.353, Sri Lanka's Ethnic Crisis and National Security, Colombo: South Asian Network on Conflict Research.

References

 
Years of the 20th century in Sri Lanka
Sri Lanka